Kirzhach is the name of several inhabited localities in Vladimir Oblast, Russia.

Urban localities
Kirzhach, a town in Kirzhachsky District

Rural localities
Kirzhach, Petushinsky District, Vladimir Oblast, a village in Petushinsky District